Arie (born Kim Hyo-shin on August 6, 1985) is South Korean singer. She is leader and member of idol rock band Arie Band, and member of project groups P.O.M (Pair of magnetar) and 나누미7일짱. Her father is Kim Sung-il, CEO of record label Garnet Entertainment.

Discography

Singles 
 R U Ready?, March 2010
 P.O.M – Beautiful, June 2014
 Merci, August 2015
 여행, September 2015
 나누미7일짱 – 이리와, February 2016

Soundtracks 
 위험한 여자 OST Part 2, January 2012
 위대한 조강지처 OST Part 3, October 2015
 위대한 조강지처 OST, November 2015
 별난가족 OST Part 2, August 2016
 혼술남녀 OST Part 6, October 2016 (with Yoon Ji-hoon)

References 

South Korean rock singers
1985 births
Living people
21st-century South Korean singers
21st-century South Korean women singers